Marie Catherine Laveau (September 10, 1801 – June 15, 1881) was a Louisiana Creole  practitioner of Voodoo, herbalist and midwife who was renowned in New Orleans. Her daughter, Marie Laveau II (1827 – c. 1862), also practiced rootwork, conjure, Native American and African spiritualism as well as Louisiana Voodoo. An alternate spelling of her name, Laveaux, is considered by historians to be from the original French spelling.

Early life
Historical records state that Marie Catherine Laveau was born a free woman of color in colonial New Orleans (today's French Quarter), Louisiana (New France), Thursday, September 10, 1801.  Marie Laveau was the biological daughter of Charles Laveau Trudeau, a white Frenchman and politician, and her mother Marguerite D'Arcantel, a free woman of color who was of white, black, and Native American ancestry.  Some historians claim that Marie Laveau's father was a black man named Charles Laveax, however there is a lack of evidence to support this theory.

On August 4, 1819, she married Jacques Paris (also known as Jacques Santiago in Spanish records), a Quadroon free man of color who had fled as a refugee from the Haitian Revolution in the former French colony Saint-Domingue. Their marriage certificate is preserved in the St. Louis Cathedral in New Orleans. The wedding mass was performed by Father Antonio de Sedella, the Capuchin priest known as Pere Antoine. Jacques was part of a large White and Creoles of Color immigration of refugees to New Orleans in 1809, after the Haitian Revolution of 1791–1804. They had two daughters, Felicite in 1817 and Angele in 1820. Both disappear from records in the 1820s. Jacques Santiago Paris worked as a carpenter. The death of Jacques Paris was recorded in 1820.

Personal life

Following the reported death of her husband Jacques Paris, she entered a domestic partnership with Christophe Dominick Duminy de Glapion, a nobleman of French descent, with whom she lived until his death in 1855. They were reported to have had 15 children (it is unclear if that includes children and grandchildren). They had seven children according to birth and baptismal records: François-Auguste Glapion, Marie-Louise "Caroline" Glapion, Marie-Angelie Paris, Celestin Albert Glapion, Arcange Glapion, Felicite Paris, Marie-Philomene Glapion, and Marie-Heloise Eucharist Glapion. The only two children to survive into adulthood were daughters: the elder named Marie Eucharist Eloise Laveau (1827–1862) and the younger named Marie Philomene Glapion (1836–1897). 

Marie Laveau is confirmed to have owned at least seven slaves during her lifetime.

During her life Marie Laveau was known to have attended to prisoners who were sentenced to death. Rumors circulated that some prisoners would receive poisons or other substances before going to the gallows, but this was never proven. A reporter from the New Orleans Republican detailed one such visit in an article published on May 14, 1871, in which he describes Marie Laveau as a “devout and acceptable member of the Catholic communion." Following her death, her daughter Philomène confirmed during an interview with a reporter from the Picayune that only Catholic traditions would take place during these visits, and that her mother would also prepare the men's last meal and pray with them. Marie Laveau also sought pardons or commutations of sentences for those she favored and was often successful in her efforts.

She was known to care for the sick in her community during the yellow fever epidemic of 1878 by providing herbal remedies and prayers for the afflicted. Her other community activities included visiting prisoners, providing lessons to the women of the community, and doing rituals for those in need without charge.

Career
Marie Laveau was a dedicated practitioner of Voodoo, healer, herbalist, and entrepreneur. Laveau was also known as a prominent female religious leader and community activist.  

Laveau started a beauty parlor where she was a hair-dresser for the wealthier families of New Orleans. She excelled at obtaining inside information on her wealthy patrons at the beauty parlor by listening to ladies gossiping, or from their servants whom she either paid or cured of mysterious ailments. She used this information during her Voodoo consultations with wealthy Orleanian women to enhance her image as a clairvoyant; and used this intel to give them practical advice. She also made money by selling her clients gris gris as charms to help their wishes come true. 

In her role as a Voodoo practitioner, customers often appealed to Laveau for help with family disputes, health, finances, and more. Laveau performed her services in three main places: her own home on St. Ann Street, within Go Square, and at Lake Pontchartrain. She was the third female leader of Voodoo in New Orleans (the first was Sanité Dédé, who ruled for a few years before being usurped by Marie Salopé). Marie Laveau maintained her authority throughout her leadership, although there was an attempt to challenge her in 1850. Due to her strong influence, New Orleans Voodoo lost a large number of adherents after her death. Her daughter, Marie Laveau II displayed more theatrical rubrics by holding public events (including inviting attendees to St. John's Eve rituals on Bayou St. John). 

Of Laveau's magical career, there is little that can be substantiated, including whether or not she had a snake she named Zombi after an African god, whether the occult part of her magic mixed Roman Catholic saints with African spirits, and Native American Spiritualism.

Death

Marie Catherine Laveau Paris Glapion died on June 15, 1881, aged 79. The different spellings of her surname result from many different women with the same name in New Orleans at the time, and her age at death from conflicting accounts of her birth date.

On June 17, 1881, it was announced in the Daily Picayune that Marie Laveau had died peacefully in her home. According to the Louisiana Writer's Project, her funeral was lavish and attended by a diverse audience including members of the white elite. Oral tradition states that she was seen by some people in town after her supposed demise. News of her death was featured in a number of newspapers, including the "Staunton Spectator" in Virginia, the "Omaha Daily Bee" in Nebraska, as well as several newspapers published in Minnesota.

At least two of her daughters were named Marie, following the French Catholic tradition to have the first names of daughters be Marie, and boys Joseph, then each use middle name as the common name. One of her daughters named Marie possibly assumed her position, with her name, and carried on her magical practice, taking over as the queen soon before or after the first Marie's death. Malvina Latour has also been reported as being Laveau's successor.

Legacy

Laveau's name and her history have been surrounded by legend and lore. She is generally believed to have been buried in plot 347, the Glapion family crypt in Saint Louis Cemetery No. 1, New Orleans, but this has been disputed by Robert Tallant, a journalist who used her as a character in historical novels. Tourists continue to visit and some draw X marks in accordance with a decades-old tradition that if people wanted Laveau to grant them a wish, they had to draw an X on the tomb, turn around three times, knock on the tomb, yell out their wish, and if it was granted, come back, circle their X, and leave Laveau an offering.

In 1982, New Jersey-based punk rock group The Misfits were arrested and accused of attempting to exhume Laveau from her grave after a local concert. The arrest took place in nearby Cemetery No. 2 and there are conflicting accounts of the incident.

The tomb in Saint Louis Cemetery No. 1 was vandalized by an unknown person on December 17, 2013, by being painted over with pink latex paint. The paint was removed because the structure is made of old plaster and the latex paint would seal in the moisture that would destroy the plaster. Some historical preservation experts criticized officials of the Archdiocese of New Orleans, who maintain the cemetery, for their decision to use pressure washing rather than paint stripper to remove it.

As of March 1, 2015, there is no longer public access to St. Louis Cemetery No. 1. Entry with a tour guide is required because of continued vandalism and the destruction of tombs. This change was made by the Archdiocese of New Orleans to protect the tombs of the Laveau family as well as those of the many other dead interred there.

Although some references to Marie Laveau in popular culture refer to her as a "witch," she has also been called a "Voudou Priestess", and she is frequently described as a 'Voodoo queen'. At the time of her death, The New York Times, The New Orleans Daily Picayune, the Daily States and other news sources describe her as "woman of great beauty, intellect, and charisma who was also pious, charitable, and a skilled herbal healer."

Some followers of Louisiana Voodoo pray to Laveau as if she were an Lwa spirit, asking her for favors and channeling her via spirit possession, though not all Louisiana Voodoo believers do this. Some leave offerings of hair ties by the plaque at her former home at 1020 St. Ann Street, gifts which honor her fame as a hairdresser.

Artistic legacy and popular culture
Due to her prominence within the history of Voodoo in New Orleans, Laveau has inspired a number of artistic renditions. In visual art, the African American artist Renee Stout often uses Laveau as a visual motif.

Numerous songs about Marie Laveau have been recorded, including "Marie La Veau" by Papa Celestin; "Marie Laveau" written by Shel Silverstein and Baxter Taylor and recorded by Dr. Hook & the Medicine Show (1972), and Bobby Bare (1974); "The Witch Queen of New Orleans" (1971) by Redbone; "Dixie Drug Store" by Grant Lee Buffalo; "X Marks the Spot (Marie Laveau)" by Joe Sample; "Marie Laveau" by Dr. John; "Marie Laveau" (2013) by Tao Of Sound; "Voodoo Queen Marie" to the minstrel tune "Colored Aristocracy" by The Holy Modal Rounders; "The Witch Queen of New Orleans" by Total Toly; and "The Widow Paris" by The Get Up Kids; "Marie Laveau" by the Danish metal band Volbeat. 

Laveau is mentioned in the songs "I Will Play for Gumbo" (1999) by Jimmy Buffett, "Clare" by Fairground Attraction, and "Rabbits Foot" by Turbowolf. Two of Laveau's nephews, banjo player Raymond Glapion and bassist Alcide "Slow Drag" Pavageau, became prominent New Orleans jazz musicians. The Los Angeles blues band Canned Heat featured a five-minute instrumental called "Marie Laveau" on their second album Boogie With Canned Heat (1968), written by and featuring their lead guitarist Henry Vestine.

A musical from 1999, Marie Christine, is also based on the life of Laveau.

Laveau has offered inspiration for a number of fictional characters as well. She is the protagonist of such novels as Robert Tallant's The Voodoo Queen (1956); Francine Prose's eponymous Marie Laveau (1977); and Jewell Parker Rhodes' Voodoo Dreams: A Novel of Marie Laveau (1993). Laveau appears as a supporting character in the Night Huntress novels by Jeaniene Frost as a powerful ghoul still living in New Orleans in the 21st century. She also appears as a background character in Barbara Hambly's Benjamin January mystery series, set in New Orleans. Marie Laveau appears in Neil Gaiman's novel American Gods, under her married name, Marie Paris. Marie Laveau's tomb is the site of a secret, fictional underground Voodoo workshop in the Caster Chronicles novel Beautiful Chaos by Kami Garcia and Margaret Stohl. Laveau's gravesite is the setting of a pivotal scene in Robert J. Randisi's short story, "Cold As The Gun," from Foreshadows The Ghosts of Zero. The mother of Hazel Levesque, one of the characters from Rick Riordan's The Heroes of Olympus book series, was known as "Queen Marie," a famous fortune-teller who lived in New Orleans. In Charlaine Harris's True Blood (Sookie Stackhouse novels) book series, the character Hadley is lured to her death at the site of Marie Laveau's tomb.

A character named Marie Laveau, based loosely on the real Marie Laveau appears in Marvel Comics.  She first appeared in Dracula Lives #2 in 1973. She is depicted as a powerful sorceress and Voodoo priestess with great magical powers and knowledge of arcane lore, including the creation of a potion made from vampire's blood that keeps her eternally youthful and beautiful. A character named Marie Laveau also appears in the Italian comic book Zagor.

In television, a heavily fictionalized Marie Laveau (portrayed by Angela Bassett) appears as a character in American Horror Story: Coven and American Horror Story: Apocalypse. 

She appears in the Canadian television series Lost Girl (portrayed by Marci T. House) in episode 11 of season 4, Young Sheldon (portrayed by Sharon Ferguson) in episode 7 of season 1, and Legends of Tomorrow (portrayed by Joyce Guy) in episode 7 of season 4.

Biographies
Alvarado, Denise. "The Magic of Marie Laveau: Embracing the Spiritual Legacy of the Voodoo Queen of New Orleans," Weiser Books (2020),.
Long, Carolyn Morrow. "A New Orleans Voudou Priestess: The Legend and Reality of Marie Laveau," Gainesville: University Press of Florida (2006),.
Tallant, Robert. "Voodoo in New Orleans", The MacMillan Co.  (1946),
Ward, Martha. "Voodoo Queen: The Spirited Lives of Marie Laveau," Oxford: University of Mississippi Press (2004).
Long, Carolyn Morrow. "The Tomb of Marie Laveau," Left Hand Press (2016)
Bloody Mary. "Hauntings Horrors and Dancing with the Dead. True Stories from the Voodoo Queen of New Orleans," Weiser publishing (2016),

See also
 Mary Oneida Toups

Notes

References

External links

 Clickable map of Tombs at St. Louis No. 1(Click on Tomb No. 347 on map.)
 NY Times archived article from 1881 regarding Marie Laveau's death

1801 births
1881 deaths
People from New Orleans
African-American Catholics
American Voodoo practitioners
Black slave owners in the United States
Religious leaders from Louisiana
American folklore
Louisiana folklore
American occultists
American slave owners
Folk saints
Louisiana Creole people
Louisiana Voodoo
Folklore of the Southern United States
Supernatural legends
People in 19th-century Louisiana
Catholics from Louisiana
19th-century occultists
Free people of color
American women slave owners
Female religious leaders
19th-century religious leaders